Så mycket bättre is a Swedish reality television show broadcast on TV4. The basic premise is that each participating musician performs their own version of a well-known song by another artist, with each episode focusing on every participant performing a different song by the same artist. The musicians spend eight days together at a hotel in Gotland, where they re-interpret the songs in their own styles.

The first series aired on 23 October 2010 and featured Lasse Berghagen, Barbro "Lill-Babs" Svensson, Petter Askergren, Thomas Di Leva, September, Christer Sandelin and Plura Jonsson. A second series premiered on 29 October 2011 and featured Lena Philipsson, Tomas Ledin, Eva Dahlgren, Mikael Wiehe, Timbuktu, Laleh and E-Type. A third season was launched on 27 October 2012 that included Darin Zanyar, Miss Li, Maja Ivarsson, Olle Ljungström, Magnus Uggla, Pugh Rogefeldt and Sylvia Vrethammar.

The format of the show is based on Beste Zangers, a Dutch show first broadcast in 2009, and since franchised to 9 countries.

Summary

Series 1 (2010)
The first series began airing in October 2010 featuring Lasse Berghagen, Thomas Di Leva, Petter Askergren, Barbro Svensson, Christer Sandelin, September, and Plura Jonsson. A compilation album was released on 1 December 2010 as CD, digital download and on Spotify.

Episode 1 – Lasse Berghagen
 Thomas Di Leva: "Sträck ut din hand"
 Plura Jonsson: "Min kärlekssång till dig"
 Lill-Babs: "En kväll i juni"
 Petter: "Stockholm i mitt hjärta" (own new version)
 Christer Sandelin: "Jennie, Jennie"
 September: "Teddybjörnen Fredriksson"

Episode 2 – Thomas Di Leva
 Lasse Berghagen: "Vi har bara varandra"
 Plura Jonsson: "Miraklet"
 Lill-Babs: "Vi får vingar när vi älskar"
 Petter: "Dansa din djävul"
 Christer Sandelin: "Naked number one"
 September: "Vem ska jag tro på"

Episode 3 – Petter
 Lasse Berghagen: "Längesen"
 Thomas Di Leva: "Min egen kärleksaffär"
 Plura Jonsson: "Logiskt"
 Lill-Babs: "Så klart!"
 Christer Sandelin: "Vinden har vänt"
 September: "Mikrofonkåt"

Episode 4 – Lill-Babs
 Lasse Berghagen: "Är du kär i mig ännu, Klas-Göran?"
 Thomas Di Leva: "När vi älskar"
 Plura Jonsson: "Snurra min jord"
 Petter: "En tuff brud i lyxförpackning"
 Christer Sandelin: "April, april"
 September: "Leva livet"

Episode 5 – Christer Sandelin
 Lasse Berghagen: "Dover-Calais"
 Thomas Di Leva: "Vill ha dig igen"
 Plura Jonsson: "Det hon vill ha"
 Petter: "Hjärtats ensamma slag"
 Lill-Babs: "Fantasi"
 September: "Vill ha dej"

Episode 6 – September
 Lasse Berghagen: "Because I Love You"
 Thomas Di Leva: "Cry for You"
 Plura Jonsson: "La La La (Never Give It Up)"
 Petter: "Satellites"
 Lill-Babs: "Looking for Love"
 Christer Sandelin: "Can't Get Over"

Episode 7 – Plura Jonsson
 Lasse Berghagen: "Somliga går med trasiga skor"
 Thomas Di Leva: "Kungarna från Broadway"
 Lill-Babs: "Huvudet högt"
 Petter: "Fulla för kärlekens skull"
 Christer Sandelin: "Pojkar, pojkar, pojkar"
 September: "Kärlekens tunga"

Episode 8 – All partners
 Lasse Berghagen: "Ding-dong"
 Thomas Di Leva och Lasse Berghagen: "Vad är frihet?
 Lill-Babs och Christer Sandelin: "Jag vill leva"
 Petter and Plura Jonsson: "Gör min dag"
 Christer Sandelin and September: "Luften darrar"
 Plura Jonsson and Thomas Di Leva: "Alice"
 September and Petter: "Satellites"

Series 2 (2011)
A second series began airing in October 2011 featuring Timbuktu, Laleh, Eva Dahlgren, Lena Philipsson, E-Type, Tomas Ledin, and Mikael Wiehe.

Episode 1 – Tomas Ledin
 Lena Philipsson: "Sensuella Isabella"
 Laleh: "Just nu!"
 Mikael Wiehe: "Blå blå känslor"
 Timbuktu: "Snart tystnar musiken"
 Eva Dahlgren: "Never Again"
 E-Type: "Sommaren är kort"

Episode 2 – Eva Dahlgren
 Timbuktu: "Kom och håll om mig"
 Tomas Ledin: Vem tänder stjärnorna
 Laleh: Ängeln i rummet
 E-Type: Jag är Gud
 Lena Philipsson: Jag klär av mig naken
 Mikael Wiehe: För att du är här

Episode 3 – Timbuktu
 Mikael Wiehe: Jag drar
 Lena Philipsson: The botten is nådd
 Eva Dahlgren: Strö lite socker på mig
 Tomas Ledin: Gott folk
 E-Type: Det löser sig
 Laleh: Alla vill till himmelen men ingen vill dö

Episode 4 – Lena Philipsson
 E-Type: Kärleken är evig
 Timbuktu: Det gör ont
 Eva Dahlgren: Standing In My Rain
 Mikael Wiehe: Om igen
 Laleh: På gatan där jag bor
 Tomas Ledin: Dansa i neon

Episode 5 – E-Type
 Tomas Ledin: Set the World on Fire
 Timbuktu: True Believer
 Laleh: Here I Go Again
 Eva Dahlgren: This Is The Way
 Mikael Wiehe: Calling Your Name
 Lena Philipsson: Life

Episode 6 – Laleh
 Eva Dahlgren: Call on Me
 Tomas Ledin: Bjurö klubb
 Mikael Wiehe: Han tuggar kex
 E-Type: Snö
 Lena Philipsson: Live Tomorrow
 Timbuktu: Kamouflage (Invisible (My Song))

Episode 7 – Mikael Wiehe
 E-Type: Titanic
 Timbuktu: "Flickan och kråkan"
 Eva Dahlgren: Mitt hjärtas fågel
 Lena Philipsson: Vem kan man lita på?
 Laleh: Fred
 Tomas Ledin: Den jag kunde va

Episode 8 – Duets
 Timbuktu & Lena Philipsson: Resten av ditt liv
 Eva Dahlgren & Mikael Wiehe: Ung och stolt
 E-Type & Tomas Ledin: Free Like A Flying Demon
 Tomas Ledin & Timbuktu: En del av mitt hjärta
 Lena Philipsson & E-Type: "Lena Anthem"
 Laleh & Eva Dahlgren: Lär mig om
 Mikael Wiehe & Laleh: Det här är ditt land

Series 3 (2012)
A third series saw the participation of 7 artists: Magnus Uggla, Olle Ljungström, Darin Zanyar, Pugh Rogefeldt, Miss Li, Sylvia Vrethammar and Maja Ivarsson.

Episode 1 – Pugh Rogefeldt
 Magnus Uggla: Vandrar i ett regn
 Miss Li: Här kommer natten
 Olle Ljungström: Dinga linga Lena
 Darin: Stockholm
 Maja Ivarsson: Mitt bästa för dig
 Sylvia Vrethammar: Små lätta moln
Result: Darin - Stockholm

Episode 2 – Olle Ljungström
 Pugh Rogefeldt: Överallt
 Miss Li: Nåt för dom som väntar
 Sylvia Vrethammar: Du sköna nya värld
 Maja Ivarsson: Norrländska präriens gudinna
 Magnus Uggla: Jag och min far
 Darin: En apa som liknar dig
Result: Maja Ivarsson - Norrländska präriens gudinna

Episode 3 – Miss Li
 Olle Ljungström: Om du lämnade mig nu
 Sylvia Vrethammar: Oh Boy
 Darin: I Can't Get You Off My Mind
 Magnus Uggla: Har hört om en tjej
 Maja Ivarsson: Dancing the Whole Way Home
 Pugh Rogefeldt: You Could Have It (So Much Better Without Me)
Result: Pugh Rogefeldt - You Could Have It (So Much Better Without Me)

Episode 4 – Magnus Uggla
 Sylvia Vrethammar: Kung för en dag
 Maja Ivarsson: Sommartid
 Pugh Rogefeldt: Varning på stan
 Darin: Astrologen
 Miss Li - 1:a gången
 Olle Ljungström: Johnny the Rucker
Result: Miss Li - 1:a gången

Episode 5 - Sylvia Vrethammar
 Darin: Magdalena (Livet före döden)
 Olle Ljungström: Eviva España
 Magnus Uggla: Tycker om dig
 Maja Ivarsson: Hasta la Vista
 Pugh Rogefeldt: Fröken i våran klass (En lärling på våran gård)
 Miss Li: Somebody Loves You
Result: Magnus Uggla - Tycker om dig

Episode 6 - Maja Ivarsson
 Miss Li: No One Sleeps When I'm Awake
 Magnus Uggla: Jag skiter i Amerika (original title "Living in America")
 Olle Ljungström: Rock 'n Roll
 Sylvia Vrethammar: Hej Monika (original title Hej hej Monika)
 Pugh Rogfeldt: Painted by Numbers
 Darin: Seven Days a Week
Result: Sylvia Vrethammer - Hej Monika

Episode 7 - Darin
 Sylvia Vrethammar: Step up
 Olle Ljungström: Who's That Girl
 Magnus Uggla: Försvinn ur mitt liv (original title: "You're Out of My Life")
 Maja Ivarsson: Want Ya!
 Pugh Rogefeldt: Money for Nothing
 Miss Li: Lovekiller

Episode 8 - Duets
 Olle Ljungström & Miss Li: Som man bäddar
 Maja Ivarsson & Pugh Rogefeldt: Hit Me!
 Magnus Uggla & Olle Ljungström: Trubaduren
 Sylvia Vrethammar & Darin: Strangers in the Night
 Miss Li & Magnus Uggla: My Heart Goes Boom
 Pugh Rogefeldt & Sylvia Vrethammar: Hog Farm
 Darin & Maja Ivarsson: Nobody Knows

Episode 9 - The reunion
Around a dining table, the participants have a reunion and watch favourite performances from the season gone by.
 Sylvia Vrethammar: Kung för en dag
 Miss Li: Här kommer natten
 Olle Ljungström: Johnny the Rocker
 Magnus Uggla: Jag och min far
 Maja Ivarsson: Dancing the Whole Way Home
 Pugh Rogefeldt: You Could Have It (So Much Better Without Me)
 Darin: En apa som liknar dig

Series 4 (2013)
A fourth series saw the participation of 7 artists: Agnes, Ulf Dageby, Lill Lindfors, Ebbot Lundberg, Bo Sundström, Titiyo and Ken Ring.

Episode 1 – Lill Lindfors
 Bo Sundström: Jag tycker inte om dig
 Ken Ring: Rus
 Titiyo: Blåjeans och stjärnljus
 Ulf Dageby: Du är den ende
 Agnes: En så'n karl
 Ebbot Lundberg: Fri som en vind

Episode 2 - Bo Sundström
 Lill Lindfors: Hon är så söt när hon sover
 Titiyo: Vi kommer aldrig att dö
 Ulf Dageby: Snart kommer natten
 Agnes: Allt ljus på mig!
 Ebbot Lundberg: Dansa på min grav

Episode 3 - Ken Ring
 Ulf Dageby: Jag minns ljudet från igår
 Lill Lindfors: Mamma
 Agnes: Nu måste vi dra
 Bo Sundström: Jag skriver för er
 Titiyo: Själen av en vän
 Ebbot Lundberg: Allanballan

Episode 4 - Titiyo
 Ulf Dageby: Come Along
 Lill Lindfors: Talking to the Man in the moon
 Agnes: Flowers
 Bo Sundström: Longing for Lullabies
 Ken Ring: This Is
 Ebbot Lundberg: Lovin Out of Nothing

Episode 5 - Ulf Dageby
 Bo Sundström: Mr John Carlos
 Agnes: Hanna från Arlöv
 Ebbot Lundberg: Barn av vår tid
 Lill Lindfors: En dag på sjön
 Ken Ring: Barn
 Titiyo: Men bara om min älskade väntar

Episode 6 - Agnes Carlsson
 Bo Sundström: One Last Time
 Ulf Dageby: On And On
 Lill Lindfors: Right here right now
 Ebbot Lundberg: Release Me
 Ken Ring: All I Want Is You
 Titiyo: I Need You Now

Episode 7 - Ebbot Lundberg
 Titiyo: Sister Surround
 Ken Ring: Firmament Vacation
 Bo Sundström: Nevermore
 Lill Lindfors: Pass Through Fear
 Agnes: Instant Repeater
 Ulf Dageby: Babel On

Series 5 (2014)

A fifth series saw the participation of 7 artists: Love Antell, Familjen, Kajsa Grytt, Carola Häggkvist (known as Carola) Amanda Jenssen,  Orup, Ola Salo.

Episode 1 – Ola Salo
 Orup — Echo Chamber (Ekokammare)
 Amanda Jensen — Calleth You, Cometh I
 Love Antell — One of Us is Gonna Die Young (En av oss kommer dö ung)
 Kajsa Grytt — It Takes a Fool to Remain Sane
 Carola Häggkvist — Tell Me this Night is Over
 Johan T Karlsson — Breaking Up With God (Göra slut med Gud)

Episode 2 - Orup
 Kajsa Grytt — Magaluf
 Love Antell — Från Djursholm till Danvikstull
 Carola Häggkvist — Sjung halleluja (och prisa Gud)
 Ola Salo — Trubbel (Trouble)
 Johan T Karlsson — Regn hos mig
 Amanda Jensen — "När vi gräver guld i USA (When We Dig for Gold in the USA)"

Episode 3 - Amanda Jenssen
 Ola Salo — Dry My Soul
 Johan T Karlsson — Do You Love Me? (Vill du ha mig?)
 Kajsa Grytt — Ghost (Kall)
 Love Antell — Happyland (I vårt lyckoland)
 Orup — Illusionist (Magiker)
 Carola Häggkvist — For the Sun

Episode 4 - Kajsa Grytt
 Johan T Karlsson — Slicka mig ren
 Carola Häggkvist — Bakom allt
 Love Antell — Dunkar Varmt
 Orup — Brinna
 Ola Salo — Allt faller
 Amanda Jensen — Vågar du vara ensam i natt

Episode 5 - Johan T Karlsson
 Carola Häggkvist — Nyår
 Ola Salo — Vi va dom
 Orup — Det snurrar i min skalle
 Love Antell — Man ser det från månen
 Kajsa Grytt — Väger ett andetag
 Amanda Jenssen — När planeterna stannat

Episode 6 - Carola Häggkvist
 Kajsa Grytt — Det regnar i Stockholm
 Love Antell — Tommy tycker om mig
 Orup — Främling
 Ola Salo — The Runaway
 Amanda Jenssen — Fångad av en stormvind
 Johan T Karlsson — Tokyo

Episode 7 - Love Antell
 Orup — Pokerkväll i Vårby Gård (Pokerkväll på Björngårdsgata)
 Ola Salo — Du växer upp
 Amanda Jenssen — Stjärna där
 Kajsa Grytt — Spring Ricco
 Johan T Karlsson — Vårt hem, vår borg
 Carola Häggkvist — Gatorna tillhör oss

Series 6 (2015)

A sixth series saw the participation of 7 artists: Niklas Strömstedt, Sven-Bertil Taube, Miriam Bryant, Jenny Berggren, Ison & Fille (Ison Glasgow and Felipe Leiva Wenger), Andreas Kleerup, and Lisa Nilsson.

Series 7 (2016)

A seventh series saw the participation of 6 artists: Magnus Carlson, Lisa Ekdahl, Jill Johnson, Little Jinder (Josefine Jinder), Tommy Nilsson, Danny Saucedo. A seventh artist, Freddie Wadling was also scheduled, but he died before the shooting of the episodes. The remaining six performers still interpreted his songs, as a tribute. An additional episode where the artists paid tribute to dead singer Ted Gärdestad was aired, in which his brother and songwriter Kenneth Gärdestad appeared as a guest.

Series 8 (2017)
An eighth series saw the participation of 7 artists: Kikki Danielsson, Sabina Ddumba, Icona Pop (duo of Caroline Hjelt and Aino Jawo), Moneybrother (Anders Olof Wendin), Eric Saade, Uno Svenningsson and Tomas Andersson Wij. An additional episode that paid tribute to then recently passed dansband and country singer Sven-Erik Magnusson was aired, in which his son Oscar Magnusson appeared as guest.

Episode 1 – Uno Svenningsson
 Anders "Moneybrother" Wendin – "Tro på varann"
 Sabina Ddumba – "Vågorna"
 Eric Saade – "Allt man kan önska sig"
 Tomas Andersson Wij – "I en annan del av världen"
 Kikki Danielsson – "At the Border" (English version of "Under ytan")
 Icona Pop – "Det måste gå"

Episode 2 – Anders "Moneybrother" Wendin
 Eric Saade – "Born Under a Bad Sign"
 Uno Svenningsson – "Du kommer ångra det här" (own Swedish version of "You'll Be Sorry")
 Sabina Ddumba – "It's Been Hurting All the Way with You, Joanna"
 Kikki Danielsson – "Reconsider Me"
 Icona Pop – "They're Building Walls Around Us"
 Tomas Andersson Wij – "Snart kommer det en båt" (samma låt med ändrad text)

Episode 3 – Sabina Ddumba
 Icona Pop – "Not Too Young"
 Tomas Andersson Wij – "Märkt av dig" (Original: "Scarred For Life")
 Anders "Moneybrother" Wendin – "Sabina säger" (Original:"Kingdom Come")
 Uno Svenningsson – "Effortless"
 Kikki Danielsson – "Did It For The Fame"
 Eric Saade – "Vill" (Original: "Want")

Episode 4 – Eric Saade
 Uno Svenningsson – "Slå!" (Original: "Sting")
 Kikki Danielsson – "Darkest Hour"
 Icona Pop – "Hearts in the Air"
 Sabina Ddumba – "Manboy"
 Tomas Andersson Wij – "Den dag jag vinner allt" (Original: "Popular")
 Anders "Moneybrother" Wendin – "Wide Awake"

Episode 5 – Kikki Danielsson
 Sabina Ddumba – "Varför är kärleken röd?"
 Tomas Andersson Wij – "Godmorgon"
 Uno Svenningsson – "Prins Decibel" (original: "Miss Decibel")
 Eric Saade – "Bra vibrationer"
 Icona Pop – "Don't Slam the Door"
 Anders "Moneybrother" Wendin – "Du ser mig inte längre" (original: "It's Not About Me Anymore")

Episode 6 – Tomas Andersson Wij
 Anders "Moneybrother" Wendin – "Tommy och hans mamma"
 Kikki Danielsson – "Hälsingland"
 Icona Pop – "The City We Call Home" (original: "Landet vi föddes i")
 Uno Svenningsson – "Ett slag för dig"
 Sabina Ddumba – "Orden i vinden"
 Eric Saade – "Där får du andas ut"

Episode 7 – Icona Pop
 Eric Saade – "We Got The World"
 Tomas Andersson Wij – "All Night"
 Uno Svenningsson – "Ingen är som jag" (original: "Manners")
 Anders "Moneybrother" Wendin – "I Love It"
 Kikki Danielsson – "Emergency"
 Sabina Ddumba – "Brightside"

Episode 8 – Sven-Erik Magnusson tribute
 Uno Svenningsson – "Säg inte nej, säg kanske"
 Eric Saade – "Fånga en dröm"
 Kikki Danielsson – "Det var dans bort i vägen"
 Icona Pop – "Sommar och sol"
 Tomas Andersson Wij – "När solen färgar juninatten"
 Anders "Moneybrother" Wendin – "Anita"
 Sabina Ddumba – "Två mörka ögon"
 Oscar Magnusson – "Så många mil så många år"

Series 9 (2018)
A ninth series saw the participation of 7 artists: Eric Gadd, Louise Hoffsten, Linnea Henriksson, Charlotte Perrelli, Stor, Christer Sjögren, and Albin Lee Meldau.

Series 10 (2019) 
A tenth series saw the participation of 13 (14) artists: Magnus Uggla, Miss Li and Petter participated in 8 programmes. The format of the show was changed this season to celebrate the ten year anniversary with guest artist visiting. Carola Häggkvist (4 of 8 programmes), Orup (4/8), Timbuktu (4/8), Danny Saucedo (3/8), Ebbot Lundberg (3/8), Petra Marklund (3/8), Jill Johnson (2/8), Little Jinder (2/8), Niklas Strömstedt (2/8), Titiyo (2/8).

Sven-Bertil Taubes participation was cancelled due to sickness.

Further artists appeared as guests for one, or several, performances.

Series 11 (2020) 
An eleventh series saw the participation of Benjamin Ingrosso, Plura Jonsson, Ana Diaz, Markus Krunegård, Lisa Nilsson, Helen Sjöholm, Tommy Körberg, Silvana Imam, Jakob Hellman, Newkid, Lili & Susie, Loreen and Tove Styrke.

See also
The Best Singers

References

2010 Swedish television series debuts
2010s reality television series
2020s reality television series
TV4 (Sweden) original programming
Swedish reality television series